Stephen Edwin Chandler (November 20, 1841, to February 1, 1919) was an American soldier who fought in the American Civil War. Chandler received the country's highest award for bravery during combat, the Medal of Honor, for his action at Amelia Springs, Virginia on 5 April 1865. He was honored with the award on 4 April 1898.

Biography
Chandler was born in Battle Creek, Michigan, on November 20, 1841. He initially joined the 24th New York Infantry in May 1861, and mustered out with this regiment in May 1863. He re-enlisted with the 24th New York Cavalry in October 1863, and was promoted to Quartermaster Sergeant two months later. He was transferred to the 1st New York Provisional Cavalry in June 1865, he mustered out again the following month. Chandler died on February 1, 1919, and his remains are interred at the Lakewood Cemetery in Minneapolis, Minnesota.

Medal of Honor citation

See also

List of American Civil War Medal of Honor recipients: A–F

References

1841 births
1919 deaths
People of Michigan in the American Civil War
People of New York (state) in the American Civil War
Union Army officers
United States Army Medal of Honor recipients
American Civil War recipients of the Medal of Honor